was a town located in Miyako District, Okinawa Prefecture, Japan.

As of 2003, the town had an estimated population of 7,042 and a density of 122.26 persons per km². The total area of 57.60 km².

On October 1, 2005, Gusukube, along with the city of Hirara, and the towns of Irabu and Shimoji, and the village of Ueno (all from Miyako District), was merged to create the city of Miyakojima.

Dissolved municipalities of Okinawa Prefecture